Jippaa Jimikki is a 2015 Indian Tamil-language romantic drama film directed by Ra Rajasekhar and starring Krishik Divakar and Kushbhu Prasad. The film was shot at Coorg.

Cast 
Krishik Divakar as Krishik 
Kushbhu Prasad as Shruti 
Aadukalam Naren as Krishik's father
Ilavarasu as a lorry driver
Rajendran as a farmer

Reception 
M. Suganth of The Times of India gave the film a rating of one out of five stars and said that "The director mutilates a dead plot with insipid writing". Malini Mannath of The New Indian Express wrote that "The screenplay is listless, the narration insipid". A critic from Dinamalar called the film documentary-like.

References

External links